Constant Camber 3M is a  cat-rigged solo harbor racer/trainer trimaran sailboat designed in the 1980s by John Marples.

See also
 List of multihulls

References

Trimarans